{{DISPLAYTITLE:C20H32O}}
The molecular formula C20H32O (molar mass: 288.46 g/mol, exact mass: 288.2453 u) may refer to:

 Bolenol, also known as ethylnorandrostenol
 Desoxymethyltestosterone
 Ethylestrenol, an anabolic steroid

Molecular formulas